This is a list of the stations of the Madrid Metro.

Line 1

Line 2

Line 3

Line 4

Line 5

Line 6

Line 7

Line 8

Line 9

Line 10

Line 11

Line 12

Ramal

 
  

 
Madrid
Stations
Madrid
Metro stations